The Paragliding World Cup (or PWC for short) is a cross country flying competition for paraglider pilots, organized by the Paragliding World Cup Association (PWCA), based in Marlens, France. Each year, the Paragliding World Cup Tour visits 5-6 different locations worldwide. At each event several tasks are flown to establish the overall classification.

The goal of each competition task is to fly round a predetermined course with a start, some turn points (usually 4-6) and a finish line. Slightly simplified, the winner is the fastest pilot round the course, or the pilot who flew furthest if no one completes the course. Pilots carry a GPS receiver to record their flight track, which is afterwards used to verify that they correctly followed the course and determine timings.

Since 2010, there is one event at the end of every year called "PWC Superfinal". The best pilots selected from the events all over the year compete to select the overall winner of the year. Before 2010 the total winner was determined by adding the results of all worldcups of the year.

Overall Winners
 2022: 
 2021: 
 2018: 
 2017: 
 2016: 
 2015: 
 2014: 
 2013: 
 2012: 
 2011: 
 2010: 
 2009: 
 2008: 
 2007: 
 2006: 
 2005: 
 2004: 
 2003: 
 2002: 
 2001: 
 2000: 
 1999: 
 1998: 
 1997: 
 1996: 
 1995: 
 1994: 
 1993: 
 1992:

Winners for 2015

Winners for 2014

Winners for 2013

Winners for 2012

Winners for 2011

Winners for 2010

Winners for 2009

Winners for 2008

Winners for 2007

Winners for 2006

Winners for 2005

Winners for 2004

See also
 Paragliding Accuracy World Cup (PGAWC)

External links
 http://www.pwca.org/
 https://musee.cquest.org/pwca/ (archived web sites including results and task reports snapshotted in 1999, 2002 and 2006)

References

Original version of this article

Paragliding